Suzaku (formerly ASTRO-EII) was an X-ray astronomy satellite developed jointly by the Institute of Space and Aeronautical Science at JAXA and NASA's Goddard Space Flight Center to probe high energy X-ray sources, such as supernova explosions, black holes and galactic clusters. It was launched on 10 July 2005 aboard the M-V launch vehicle on the M-V-6 mission. After its successful launch, the satellite was renamed Suzaku after the mythical Vermilion bird of the South.

Just weeks after launch, on 29 July 2005, the first of a series of cooling system malfunctions occurred. These ultimately caused the entire reservoir of liquid helium to boil off into space by 8 August 2005. This effectively shut down the X-ray Spectrometer-2 (XRS-2), which was the spacecraft's primary instrument. The two other instruments, the X-ray Imaging Spectrometer (XIS) and the Hard X-ray Detector (HXD), were unaffected by the malfunction. As a result, another XRS was integrated into the Hitomi X-ray satellite, launched in 2016, which also was lost weeks after launch. A Hitomi replacement, XRISM, will launch in mid-2023.

On 26 August 2015, JAXA announced that communications with Suzaku had been intermittent since 1 June 2015, and that the resumption of scientific operations would be difficult to accomplish given the spacecraft's condition. Mission operators decided to complete the mission imminently, as Suzaku had exceeded its design lifespan by eight years at this point. The mission came to an end on 2 September 2015, when JAXA commanded the radio transmitters on Suzaku to switch themselves off.

Spacecraft instruments 
Suzaku carried high spectroscopic resolution, very wide energy band instruments for detecting signals ranging from soft X-rays up to gamma-rays (0.3–600 keV). High resolution spectroscopy and wide-band are essential factors to physically investigate high energy astronomical phenomena, such as black holes and supernova. One such feature, the K-line (x-ray), may be key to more direct imaging of black holes.

 X-ray Telescope (XRT)
 X-ray Spectrometer-2 (XRS-2)
 X-ray Imaging Spectrometer (XIS)
 Hard X-ray Detector (HXD)
 Uses Gadolinium Silicate crystal (GSO), Gd2SiO5(Ce)
 Uses Bismuth Germanate crystal (BGO), Bi4Ge3O12

ASTRO-E 
Suzaku was a replacement for ASTRO-E, which was lost in a launch failure. The M-V launch vehicle on the M-V-4 mission launched on 10 February 2000 at 01:30:00 UTC but experienced a failure 42 seconds later, failing to achieve orbit and crashing with its payload into the Indian Ocean.

Results 
Suzaku discovered "fossil" light from a supernova remnant.

References

Further reading 
 Special Issue: First Results from Suzaku Publications of the Astronomical Society of Japan. Vol. 59, No. SP1 30 January 2007. Retrieved 4 October 2010.

External links 
 X-ray Astronomy Satellite "Suzaku" (ASTRO-EII) (JAXA)
 JAXA/ISAS Suzaku (ASTRO-EII) mission overview
 JAXA/ISAS Suzaku Information for Researchers
 JAXA report presentation of failure analysis of XRS (in Japanese)
 
 NASA ASTRO-EII mission description
 NASA/GSFC Suzaku Learning Center 
 NASA/GSFC XRS-2 project page

X-ray telescopes
Space telescopes
Satellites of Japan
Spacecraft launched in 2005